Kurukshetra (Bengali: কুরুক্ষেত্র) (English: Battlefield) is a 2002 Bengali action romance film directed by Swapan Saha and produced by Debendra Kuchar.The film features actors Prosenjit Chatterjee and Rachana Banerjee in the lead roles. Music of the film has been composed by Ashok Bhadra.

Cast 
 Prosenjit Chatterjee as Agun Chowdhury
 Rachana Banerjee as Anjali
 Tapas Paul as Rahul Roy
 Jisshu Sengupta as Shagor Chowdhury
 Laboni Sarkar as Rubi Roy
 Subhasish Mukhopadhyay as Chipi
 Abdur Razzak as Raj Shekhar Chowdhury
 Kalyani Mondal as Mamata Chowdhury
 Dulal Lahiri as Poran Chakroborthy 
 Kaushik Banerjee as Protul Roy
 Moumita Chakraborty as Nodi Roy, Rahul's younger sister

References 

2002 films
Bengali-language Indian films
2000s Bengali-language films
Indian action drama films
2000s action drama films
Indian drama films